Salina Turda is a salt mine in the Durgău-Valea Sărată area of Turda, the second largest city in Cluj County, northwest Romania. Opened for tourists in 1992, the Salina Turda mine was visited by about 618,000 Romanian and foreign tourists in 2017.

Salina Turda was ranked in 2013 by Business Insider as among the "25 hidden gems around the world that are worth the trek".

History 
Salt was first extracted here during the antiquity. The mine continuously produced table salt from the Middle Ages, the mine being first mentioned in 1075, to the early–20th century (1932).

The first document that speaks explicitly about the existence of a salt mine in Turda dates from 1 May 1271, being issued by the Hungarian chancellery. Documents preserved from the 13th and 14th centuries that refer to the Turda salt mines mention that salines were arranged in the Băile Sărate microdepression and on the southeastern slope of the Valea Sărată. Operating rooms were placed at the sites of current salt lakes from the areas mentioned above. In the 17th century the first salt mining works began on the north-western slope of Valea Valea Sărată, as evidenced by shafts in the dome of the Terezia room. Shortly after, the Sfântul Anton mine was opened, where mining activity continued until the first half of the 20th century.

Renovation 
The Turda salt mine was renovated, and it reopened its doors in 2010 after a €5,888,000 investment.

Since 1992, Salina Turda has been a halotherapy center and a popular tourist attraction. In 2008 the salt mine was modernized and improved under the program PHARE 2005 ESC large regional/local infrastructure, worth six million euros. It was reopened for tourism in January 2010.

Main attractions

Iosif mine 
The Iosif Mine can be visited through the balconies carved in salt. It is next to the Franz Josef Gallery. Because of its shape and lack of communication with the other major mining points, this mine has a powerful echo, leading to it being called the "Echoes Room".

Crivac room 

The octagonal room hosts a winch called "crivac" or "gepel", rudimentary machinery used to lift salt rocks on the surface. It dates from 1881. This machine replaced another, smaller in size, that was installed in 1864. It is the only machine of its kind, in all the salt mines in Romania and probably in Europe, that remains in its original location.

Terezia mine 

This is a conical mine (bell mine). Salt mining in this type of room left behind underground halls of impressive dimensions:  height and  diameter. A "cascade of salt", an underground lake, stalactites, and salt efflorescences complete the inert equilibrium of the giant bell. In the center of the lake there is an island formed from residual low-grade salt deposited here after 1880, the year when salt mining ended in this room.

Rudolf mine 
Through the compartment of access, 172 steps lead to the mine hearth. On the walls of each of the 13 "floors" is marked the year when the respective level was opened. The panoramic elevator offers tourists an overview of the whole mine.

Gizela mine 
The Gizela mine and technical rooms in the northeastern extremity of the salt mine are similar to those of the Rudolf mine but much smaller because the salt exploration stopped shortly after the opening of this mine. Currently this mine serves as a spa treatment room with natural aerosols.

The underground gallery of this mine constitutes a geological reserve, with no access allowed to tourists. Infiltrations of water in the extraction pit determined the deposits of efflorescences and formation of stalactites, and in the lake that partially covers the hearth of the room are salt crystals. The room has received the tourist name of Crystal Hall.

Gallery

See also 
 Seven Wonders of Romania
 Salt therapy
 Praid salt mines 
 Slănic Prahova salt mine
 Ocnele Mari salt mine
 Târgu Ocna mine salt mine
 Cacica salt mine

References

External links 

 Official site
  Turda Salt Mine Photos
  Turda Salt Mine Wallpapers
  Eine Reise ins goldene Land Rumäniens
  Turda Salt Mine

Turda
Tourist attractions in Romania
Salt mines in Romania
Salt museums